Munteni is a commune in Galați County, Western Moldavia, Romania with a population of 6,791 people. It is composed of four villages: Frunzeasca, Munteni, Țigănești, and Ungureni. It also included two other villages until 2004, when they were split off to form Negrilești Commune.

Natives
Cocuța Conachi (1829–1870), princess and revolutionary 
Costache Conachi (1777–1849), writer 
Gabriel Marin (born 1972), rower
Eugenio Ruspoli (1866–1893), Italian explorer and naturalist
Mario Ruspoli, 2nd Prince of Poggio Suasa (1867–1963), Italian prince

References

Communes in Galați County
Localities in Western Moldavia